The Zhonghe Myanmar Street is an area name along the Huaxin Street in Zhonghe District, New Taipei, Taiwan.

History
In the 1980s, many descendants of Republic of China Armed Forces migrated to Taiwan from Myanmar and Thailand seeking for a better life. Many of them settled in Zhonghe around this street area. The older generations of these people were the troops stationed in southern China who remained the country after the end of Chinese Civil War and the establishment of the People's Republic of China in 1949. Those soldiers waited for Chiang Kai-shek's command, who has fled to Taiwan along with his troops, to retake back the mainland from the People's Liberation Army. Since the retake never happened, some of those troops migrated to Myanmar (then part of British India) and Thailand, and some also repatriated to Taiwan, with thousands more coming in the following decades.

Architecture
There are few little Burmese temples along the street.

Demographics
There are estimated around 40,000 Burmese-descendant people reside around the street area. It is the largest community of Burmese-Chinese people outside Myanmar.

Business
The street is filled with many Burmese cuisine restaurants.

Gallery

Activities
The street is the venue for the annual Thingyan festival.

Transportation
The area is accessible within walking distance south of Nanshijiao Station of Taipei Metro.

See also
 Islam in Taiwan

References

Streets in Taiwan
Zhonghe District
Burmese diaspora in Asia
Burmese cuisine
Ethnic enclaves in Asia